Gregory Lemont Jeffries (born October 16, 1971) is a former American football safety in the National Football League (NFL) for two teams.  He played college football for the University of Virginia.

1971 births
Living people
Virginia Cavaliers football players
American football safeties
Detroit Lions players
Miami Dolphins players
Sportspeople from High Point, North Carolina